The L.A. Dream Team was a hip hop group based in Los Angeles, California, active 1985-1989, 1993, and 1996. The group was founded by Chris "Snake Puppy" Wilson and Rudy Pardee in 1985. They are known for being one of the early hip hop acts on the West Coast and one of the pioneers of the West Coast hip hop scene.

History
The group was formed in the early 1980s by Rudy Pardee and Chris "Snake Puppy" Wilson. The duo formed their own Dream Team Records label, going on to release their own records and also releases by other California rap artists. Some of the group's best known early releases are "The Dream Team Is in the House", "Nursery Rhymes" and "Rockberry Jam". The group expanded later with Lisa Love, The Real Richie Rich and Big Burt. In 1986, the group signed with MCA Records who released their albums, Kings Of The West Coast (1985) and Bad To The Bone (1986). In 1986, Lisa "Miss Rockberry" Love died in an auto accident. The group replaced Love with two female artists: Robin Williams (The Robin) and Tanisha Hill (known as Tish Jones). The newly formed lineup recorded the 1989 album, Back to Black, also released by MCA Records.

By 1986, as electro music began to receive more mainstream coverage, the group's popularity began to wane. Their popularity was further diminished by the rise of West Coast gangsta rap in the early 1990s. 

From 1990 to 1991, Rudy Pardee worked on making new music with various artists. Then in 1992 thru 1994, Rudy, along with rapper/producer Friend-Z and rapper/comedian TJ "Ragaman-T" briefly resurfaced under the name DTP which stood for Dream Team Posse, but was later changed to mean Diverse Thought Process. They completed an album titled "Footsoldiers On Maneuvers" accompanied on some tracks by rap group DBS Mob and rapper/producer Paranoia Dragon. They did release a single "Rockberry Revisited", an updated version of "Rockberry Jam".  It included a b-side titled "100 Proof(To the Zoom)" The album however still remains unreleased, due to Rudy wanting to change direction, and wanting to lean towards a gangsta rap image.

Chris Wilson also went on to work with others, and made an unreleased ep. He also went on to a career in video and music production. Pardee worked in computing, working for Universal as a business services analyst, and later a project manager. 

Rudy and Chris briefly resurfaced together to release a new single, with a more G-Funk style.

Pardee later formed the group, Family Dream, featuring former Dream Team members Big Burt, Tanisha Hill and The Robin. The group was signed to Motown Records. Rudy Pardee died in a scuba-diving accident in 1998.

Discography

Singles 
"Calling on the Dream Team" (12") (1985) Dream Team
"Rockberry Jam" (12") (1985) Dream Team
"The Dream Team Is in the House" (12") (1985) Dream Team
"And the Orchestra Plays" (12") (1986) MCA
"Hollywood Boulevard" / "You're Just Too Young" (12") (1986) MCA
"Nursery Rhymes" (12") (1986) MCA
"The Dream Team Is in the House" (12") (1986) MCA
"Citizens on Patrol" / "Hollywood Boulevard" (12") (1987) MCA
"Rudy and Snake" (12") (1987) MCA
"Pitchin a Fit" (12") (1988) MCA
"She Only Rock and Rolls" / "Stop To Start" (12") (1988) MCA
"Doin' the Nasty" (12") (1989) MCA
"You're Slippin" (12") (1989) MCA
"The Bounce" (12") (1991) Dream Team
"100 Proof (To the Zoom)" (12"), (cassette), (compact disc) (Excello Records) (1993)
"Rockberry Revisited" (1993)

Albums 
Kings of the West Coast (LP) (1986) MCA
Bad to the Bone (LP) (1986) MCA
Back to Black (LP) (1989) MCA

Television  
 What's Happening Now (1987) Taking The Rap

References

External links 
 L.A. Dream Team at iTunes
 L.A. Dream Team at West Coast Pioneers
 

Hip hop groups from California
American electro musicians
Musical groups from Los Angeles